Malaysian Gods is a 2009 Malaysian documentary film directed by Amir Muhammad and produced by Da Huang Pictures. Although not fully banned (unlike the director's last two documentaries), the Malaysian Film Censorship Board disallowed it from screening in cinemas and on TV. It thus was screened on college campuses and at private venues.

It premiered on 18 April 2009 at the 22nd Singapore International Film Festival.

Synopsis 
In September 1998, Anwar Ibrahim was sacked as Deputy Prime Minister of Malaysia. His expulsion and subsequent trial for corruption and sodomy triggered a wave of street protests by his supporters and those who were against the authoritarian rule of the government of Dr. Mahathir Mohamad. The label for this movement and era was 'reformasi' (reformation). Malaysian Gods takes a look at several pivotal protests that took place in the year following his sacking. It eschews archive footage in favour of interviews with people who are living, working in or visiting the actual locations of the demonstrations, about a decade later. All the interviews are done in Tamil, the main language of the smallest of the three major ethnic groups. What do people now have to say about their lives, hopes and dreams? And have the socio-political markers of Malaysian society changed all that much since then?

Production information 
 Amir Muhammad ... Writer/Director/Producer
 Tan Chui Mui ... Executive Producer
 Shan ... Director of Photography
 MS Prem Nath ... Editor
 Closing song by Couple.
 Duration: 70 min
 Budget: RM25,000

References

External links 
 
 Malaysian Gods at Da Huang Pictures.

Tamil-language Malaysian films
2009 films
Malaysian political films
Malaysian documentary films
2000s Tamil-language films
Films about freedom of expression
Films directed by Amir Muhammad
Films produced by Amir Muhammad
Malaysian independent films
2009 independent films
Da Huang Pictures films
Films with screenplays by Amir Muhammad
2009 documentary films
Film controversies in Malaysia